Jeremy Caranci (born January 11, 1993) is a Canadian soccer player who played in the Canadian Soccer League, Lega Pro, and Serie D.

Playing career 
Caranci began his career in 2011 with London City of the Canadian Soccer League. Throughout the season he played in the CSL Second Division with London's reserve squad, and recorded nine goals. The league awarded him with the CSL D2 Rookie of the Year award. In 2012, he went abroad to Italy to sign with Benevento Calcio in the Lega Pro. He first featured in the youth ranks till eventually making an appearance with the senior team. In 2013, he signed with A.S.D. Barletta 1922 in the Serie D after making three appearances with the club he was released at the conclusion of the season.

References 

1983 births
Living people
Benevento Calcio players
Canadian Soccer League (1998–present) players
Canadian soccer players
Canadian expatriate soccer players
London City players
Serie C players
Serie D players
Soccer players from London, Ontario
Association football midfielders